The Key to Midnight is a suspense-horror novel by American writer Dean Koontz, released in 1979 under the pseudonym Leigh Nichols. It is considered Koontz's first success.

Overview 
In the 1995 paperback edition, Koontz states that The Key to Midnight "is not like anything else I have done"; he also explained that he revised the novel for that year's edition, cutting 30,000 words and adding 5,000. In August 2010, Koontz released a "better" version in Paperback.

Plot synopsis 

Lisa Chelgrin is a US Senator's daughter. Her life has been erased and true past blocked. Her imposed, fake new identity is Joanna Rand. A detective, Alex Hunter, is hired to track Lisa down, but he finds nothing. Years later, during a vacation in Kyoto, Japan, he views a lounge act in which Lisa Chelgrin performs. Her name is different than it was before, and she is older, now working as the nightclub owner and singer. Nevertheless, the detective knows it is she. He sends for his dead-case file, and his privately employed messenger is almost killed delivering it. Someone is watching him and Lisa.

At the same time, a person known as The Doctor (Inamura) is trying to find a way around Lisa's memory block, and he assumes that, by removing a "password" or "pass-phrase," he can access Lisa's true memories. Under hypnosis, however, Lisa can only repeat the phrase "tension, apprehension, and dissension have begun," instead of answering the questions The Doctor asks her about her true past. After the first series of events, Lisa and Alex try to deal with their respective pasts so they can survive.

Characters 
 Lisa Chelgrin/Joanna Rand
 Alex Hunter
 The Doctor/ Omi Inamura
 Mariko
 Franz Rotenhausen/ The Hand 
 Tom Chelgrin/ Ilya Lyshenko
 Wayne Kennedy
 Ursula Zaitsev
 Anson Peterson/ Anton Broskov
 Antonio Paz
 Ignacio Carrera
 Marlowe

References

External links 
 The Key to Midnight Book Review

American horror novels
1979 American novels
Novels by Dean Koontz
Works published under a pseudonym